Pirouz Mojtahedzadeh (born 9 February 1946) is an Iranian political scientist and historian.
He is a prominent Iranologist, geopolitics researcher, historian and political scientist. He teaches geopolitics at the Tarbiat Modares University of Tehran. He has been the advisor of the United Nations University. Mojtahedzadeh has published more than 20 books in Persian, English and Arabic on the geopolitics of Persian Gulf region and modern discourses in international relations. Since 2004, he has been a member of the Academy of Persian Language and Literature. He has been a member of the British Institute of Iranian Studies since 1993. Mojtahedzadeh earned a Ph.D. in political geography from the University of London in 1993 and a Ph.D. in political geography from the University of Oxford in 1979.

Mojtahedzadeh is currently a professor of geopolitics at Tarbiat Modares University. He is a member of Campaign Against Sanctions and Military Intervention in Iran (CASMII) UK. On 4 July 2007, he made a presentation regarding Iran's energy needs and its nuclear energy program at a conference at the European Parliament organised by the European Greens–European Free Alliance.

Education
1967-1971: University of Tehran - B.A. in human and economic geography
1974-1976: University of Manchester - M.A. in political geography
1976-1979: University of Oxford - D.Phil. in political geography
1990-1993: University of London - Ph.D. in political geography

Positions

1985–2011: Chairman: Urosevic Research Foundation of London
1997-1999: Visiting Professor: University of Tehran
1999–present: Professor of Political Geography and Geopolitics: Tarbiat Modarres University (Tehran) 
1986–present: Senior Research Associate, Geopolitics & International Boundaries Research Centre, SOAS/University of London                                                           
1995-1996: Consultant of United Nations University
Member of the Board, Society for contemporary Iranian Studies, University of London                                                              
Member of the British Institute of Persian Studies, London
2008: a key member of Persian Gulf Studies Center

Books
Political Geography of the Strait of Hormuz (1991, CNMES/SOAS Occasional Paper Publication, University of London)
The Changing World Order and the Geopolitical Regions of The Persian Gulf and Caspian - Central Asia (1992, Urosevic Foundation, London)
The Islands of Tunb and Abu Musa (1995, CNMES/SOAS Occasional Paper Publication, University of London)  
The Amirs of Borderlands and Eastern Iranian Borders (1996, Urosevic Research Foundation, London)
Security and Territoriality in The Persian Gulf - A Maritime Political Geography (1999 London, Curzon Press, London, and 2002 New York) 	 
Small Players of the Great Game (2004, Routledge/Curzon, London) 
Boundary Politics and International Boundaries of Iran (2007, Universal Publishers, USA)  	 
The UAE and Iranian Islands of Tunbs and Abu Musa (2007, Institute International d’ Etudes Strategique, Paris)

See also
Intellectual movements in Iran

Notes

External links
Pirouz MojtahedZadeh Official website

20th-century Iranian historians
Academic staff of the University of Tehran
Academic staff of Tarbiat Modares University
1946 births
Living people
Alumni of SOAS University of London
People from Nur, Iran